Joanne Campbell (8 February 1964 – 20 December 2002) was a British actress and drama therapist best known for playing Liz in the  1980s sitcom Me and My Girl and Josephine Baker on stage in This Is My Dream.

Career
Born in Northampton, Campbell attended Northampton High School before training in London at the Arts Educational School.  She then began her acting career at the Theatre Royal in Stratford East, in 1982, playing Jack in "Jack and the Beanstalk" and becoming the first black principal boy in British pantomime. 

After several other on stage acting roles, Campbell won her first lead role in 1987, playing Josephine Baker in This is my Dream.  Later, she combined acting with teaching as one of the founding members of the BiBi Crew, the first British theatre company made up entirely of black actresses. As one of the group of seven, she co-wrote and acted in several plays, whose aim was to share the black experience to a wide audience. 

As well as the above-mentioned comedies, her other television roles included parts in Dramarama, The Bill, London's Burning, and Birds of a Feather.  Campbell also appeared in children's shows Bodger and Badger and Alphabet Castle.  She also worked in radio in Mama I Want to Sing and The Cotton Club at the Aldwych Theatre, to mixed reviews.

In the 1990s, in addition to becoming a member of the board of directors of the Theatre Royal Stratford East, Campbell became a drama therapist and worked mostly with children at the Priory Hospital in North London. Unfortunately, she was not able complete her training to become a child and adolescent psychiatrist.

Death
Campbell died suddenly as a result of deep-vein thrombosis aged 38 in London in 2002. At the time of her death she was working on the new BBC children's show U Get Me.

Filmography

Television

References

External links
 
BiBi Crew Homepage

British film actresses
1964 births
2002 deaths
Deaths from thrombosis
British television actresses
20th-century British actresses
People from Northampton
British stage actresses